The official world records in the 10,000 metres are held by Ugandan Joshua Cheptegei with 26:11.00 minutes for men and Ethiopian Letesenbet Gidey with 29:01.03 for women.

The first world record in the men's 10,000 metres was recognized by the International Association of Athletics Federations in 1912. The first ratified record, Jean Bouin's time of 30:58.8 minutes, had been run the year before. As of June 21, 2009, 37 men's world records have been ratified by the IAAF in the event.

The first world record in the women's 10,000 metres was recognized by the International Association of Athletics Federations in 1981. As of June 21, 2009, eight women's world records have been ratified by the IAAF in the event. Before the event was recognised by the IAAF as an official world record event the 3000 metres was the most common international women's long-distance track event, although women did sometimes compete over 10,000 m before its addition to the World Championships and Olympic programme in 1987 and 1988, respectively.

Men

Pre-IAAF

 Howitt's time was recorded at the point of 10,186 m, en route to a longer distance.
 George's times were recorded at the  point.

IAAF world records

Where present, the "Auto" column gives a fully automatic time that was additionally recorded where the ratified mark was hand-timed, or from which the ratified mark was rounded to the 10th of a second, depending on the rules then in place.

Auto times to the hundredth of a second were accepted by the IAAF for events up to and including 10,000 m from 1981. However, Henry Rono's 27:22.4, timed to the hundredth at 27:22.47, was not adjusted from 1981.

Women

Pre-recognition

IAAF world records

References

10000
World record
Articles which contain graphical timelines